The 2020 European Aquatics Championships (also known as the 2021 European Aquatics Championships; 35th) were scheduled to take place in Budapest, Hungary, from 11 to 24 May 2020. However, on 5 May it was announced that the event had been postponed due to the COVID-19 pandemic, with 10 to 23 May 2021 set as replacement dates.

Schedule 
A total of 73 medal events were held across 4 disciplines. Competition dates by discipline are:

 Swimming: 17–23 May
 Open water swimming: 12–16 May
 Artistic swimming: 10–15 May
 Diving: 10–16 May

Venues
The venues of the competition will be the Danube Arena, in central Budapest, for swimming, diving and artistic swimming events and the Lupa Lake, located in the town of Budakalász (part of the Budapest metropolitan area) for open water swimming events. Three other venues will be used for practice and training: the Komjádi Pool, the BVSC Pool and the Széchy Tamás Pool.

Overall medal table

Team trophy
Results:

Swimming (50 m)

Open water swimming

Artistic swimming

Diving

Swimming

Medal table

Men

 Swimmers who participated in the heats only and received medals.

Women

 Swimmers who participated in the heats only and received medals.

Mixed events

 Swimmers who participated in the heats only and received medals.

Diving

Medal table

Men

Women

Mixed events

Open water swimming

Medal table

Men

Women

Mixed events

Artistic swimming

Medal table

Results

References

External links
 Official website
 Official LEN website
 Results book − Artistic swimming
 Results book − Diving
 Results book − Open water swimming
 Results book − Swimming

2020
 
European Championships
2021 in Hungarian sport
Swimming competitions in Hungary
International sports competitions in Budapest
International aquatics competitions hosted by Hungary
2020s in Budapest
European Aquatics Championships
European Aquatics Championships